Paracondeellum is a genus of proturans in the family Protentomidae, found in China.

Species
 Paracondeellum dukouense Tang & Yin, 1988

References

Protura